One Night Only was a series of professional wrestling events held by Impact Wrestling launched in April 2013. The concept was announced on January 11, 2013 by then-Total Nonstop Action (TNA) President Dixie Carter as a part of a change to their pay-per-view programming. Prior to the change, the company held live pay-per-view events monthly. 

The series consists of events that are taped and released later periodically on pay-per-view, typically on the first Friday of every month, except for the months that featured one of the company's main pay-per-view events. Promoted as individual "specials", the One Night Only series — unlike the live pay-per-view events — were not initially connected to the storylines featured on Impact's flagship television show, nor to each other or the mainline pay-per-view events. From 2015, storylines from Impact! would be incorporated into future One Night Only events. 

In 2018, the events began streaming exclusively on the Impact's Global Wrestling Network. The following year, with the launch of Impact Plus, the One Night Only series would be discontinued and succeeded by the Impact Plus Monthly Specials.

2013

2014

2015

2016

2017

2018

2019

References

External links
 ImpactWrestling.com – the official website of Impact Wrestling